Hangö Idrottsklubb (aka Hangö IK, or HIK for short) is a sports club from Hanko, Finland. The club was founded in 1903. It is best known for its football team which has played one season in the Finnish premier division Mestaruussarja, in 1962, and a number of seasons in the second tier Ykkönen. Their home ground is located at the Rukki Arena. The club also has activities in handball, athletics, table tennis and powerlifting.

History

HIK was formed in 1903 which establishes them as one of the oldest clubs in the south-west of Finland.  They have a long football history which reached its summit with one season in the highest division, the Mestaruussarja (Championship), back in 1962.  They have also had 13 seasons in the Suomisarjaa (Finland League) which at that time was the second tier of Finnish football in 1939, 1948, 1955–61 and 1963–66.  They also have played 6 seasons at the same level more recently in the Ykkönen from 1996 until 2001.

In 1996 HIK came within a whisker of reaching the Veikkausliiga (Finnish Premier League) by winning the Ykkönen South Group (Etelälohko) and then losing the promotion play-off 2–8 on aggregate with TP Seinäjoki.  They then lost 1–2 on aggregate to HJK Helsinki in the promotion/relegation playoff. In 1999 and 2000 the club were again very close indeed in gaining promotion to the Veikkausliiga finishing top of the Ykkönen South Group (Etelälohko) but on each occasion failed to progress in the promotion play-offs.  Sadly in 2002 the club withdrew from the Ykkönen and dropped to the Kolmonen where they have subsequently remained.

HIK have had three periods covering 17 seasons in the Kakkonen (Second Division), the third tier of Finnish football from 1973 to 1975, 1981–84 and 1986–95.

The highest ever attendance for a HIK match was in 1962 when 2,551 people attended the home game with MIFK.

Season to season

Junior section

HIK has a junior section with a large number of teams.  The main event run by the club is the Itämeri Cup tournament which in 2010 was held from Friday 30 July until Sunday 1 August.  Another event run by the club in the winter months is the Hanko Cup.

Club structure

HIK currently has 2 men's teams, 10 boys' teams and 2 girls' teams.

Current squad

References and sources
Official website
Official football club website
Finnish Wikipedia
Suomen Cup

Footnotes

Football clubs in Finland
Indrottsklubb
1903 establishments in Finland